The Huma River is a right tributary on the northern loop of the Amur River in China's province of Heilongjiang.

Somewhere near its mouth was the Russian fort of Kumarsk at the time of the Russian–Manchu border conflicts. At the time it was also called "Kamora River"  or "Houmar River".

References

Rivers of Heilongjiang